is a Japanese manga series written and illustrated by Minoru Furuya. It was serialized in Kodansha's seinen manga magazine Weekly Young Magazine from July 2003 to June 2005, with its chapters collected in six tankōbon volumes.

Media

Manga
Written and illustrated by Minoru Furuya, Ciguatera was serialized in Kodansha's seinen manga magazine Weekly Young Magazine from July 14, 2003, to June 6, 2005. Kodansha collected its chapters in six tankōbon volumes, released from December 25, 2003, to August 5, 2005.

In North America, the manga was licensed for English release by Kodansha USA (as a Vertical title) published it in a three-volume omnibus edition, released from November 9, 2021, to July 12, 2022.

Volume list

Drama
In March 2023, it was announced that the series will receive a television drama adaptation, directed by Masataka Hayashi, Yū Inose, Takahiro Takasugi, and Yōsuke Nakamura, with scripts by Yōsuke Masaike, and set to premiere on TV Tokyo's "Drama 24" block on April 7 of the same year. It will star Kotarō Daigo as Yusuke Ogino and Nagisa Sekimizu as Yumi Nagumo.

Reception
Ciguatera was one of the Jury Recommended Works at the 8th and 9th Japan Media Arts Festival in 2004 and 2005, respectively.

Notes

References

External links

Coming-of-age anime and manga
Kodansha manga
Romance anime and manga
Seinen manga
Vertical (publisher) titles